Wan Bhachran , is a town committee of Mianwali District in Punjab province of Pakistan. It is part of Mianwali Tehsil. The word 'Wan' means 'a well' in the Punjabi language. It refers to the well that is situated in the town made by Sher Shah Suri. Whereas 'Bhachars' refers to khoker rajput, Bhachar clan is prevalent in this part of the region.

In the British era, Wan Bhachran was an independent state consisting of several surrounding areas, including Wan Bhachran City, Pakka Ghanjera, Nangni, Chak Maris, Nari, Sheikhali, Chandni, Phati, Chor Wala, Tibi, Shadia, Pakka Sandan Wala, Muhammad Shah, Bhattian Wala, Jhabar, Bhouki, Kabari, Main Din Wala, Natalanwala, Khichi, Asran Wala, Anwar Chowk, Bala Sharif, Vichven, and several Chakouk etc.

These areas come under the jurisdiction of Wan Bhachran police station

The people of Wan Bhachran and surrounding areas speak Punjabi and belong to different castes of the Muslim Jutt tribe.

Wheat, rice, sugarcane, millet, corn, millet, cotton, peanuts, canola orchards, canola, gram, guava, peanuts and sunflower are the popular crops here.

Images

Refe

Archaeological sites in Punjab, Pakistan
Union councils of Mianwali District
Populated places in Mianwali District